Lady Gaga Enigma + Jazz & Piano is a concert residency held at the Park Theater, Park MGM in Las Vegas, United States, by American singer and songwriter Lady Gaga. The residency consists of two types of shows: Enigma, which focuses on theatricality and includes the singer's biggest hits, and Jazz & Piano, which involves songs from the Great American Songbook and stripped-down versions of Gaga's songs. The Enigma show was built around a loose storyline about "healing and finding yourself", and saw Gaga wearing various sci-fi inspired outfits. For Jazz & Piano, Gaga aimed for "glamour and elegance", with her wardrobe harkening back to the Jazz Age and vintage Vegas. The Enigma shows opened on December 28, 2018, and the Jazz & Piano shows opened on January 20, 2019. After a 21-month long hiatus due to the COVID-19 pandemic, Gaga returned to Vegas on October 14, 2021. 

The Enigma show was complimented for its theatricality and Gaga’s showmanship, although some reviewers found it disjointed, and deemed the narrative confusing and unnecessary. The Jazz & Piano concerts were critically acclaimed – journalists found them a nostalgic throwback to the "Golden Age" of Las Vegas, and praised Gaga's vocal skills. Enigma + Jazz & Piano became the highest grossing Las Vegas concert residency of 2019. With the residency's gross, Gaga also became the fifth woman to pass the half-billion career total as per Billboard Boxscore.

Background and development

In December 2017, Lady Gaga announced her two-year Las Vegas residency at Park Theater at Park MGM, starting in December 2018. The deal is reportedly worth $100 million, includes 74 performances with a possible extension. In July 2018, Ticketmaster website had mistakenly uploaded details about a "2 Show Bundle" for the residency with tentative name as Enigma and ticket sales from the end of that month. The link was quickly removed and the residency was finally announced on August 7, 2018. It was named Lady Gaga Enigma with 27 dates, starting from December 28, 2018, to November 9, 2019. Two different shows were listed with the press release, with Enigma described as a "brand-new odyssey of [Gaga's] pop hits built as an experience unlike any other," and Jazz & Piano painted as featuring stripped-down versions of her songs accompanied by tracks from the Great American Songbook. Gaga described the show as "unlike anything I've done before. It will be a celebration of all that is unique and different within us. The challenges of bravery can be overcome with creativity and courage that is grown out of adversity, love and music." Five additional dates were added to the itinerary for the Jazz & Piano shows.

Development of the residency took place while Gaga was promoting her 2018 movie, A Star is Born, therefore only a short amount of time was available for the creative process. Gaga released a promotional poster accompanying the announcement of the residency, colored in day-glo paint. She wore a neon green tulle dress by designers Laurence & Chico, with latex gloves and a swim cap from Vex Clothing. The image was photographed by Inez and Vinoodh and styled by Gaga's longtime collaborator Nicola Formichetti. Matt Moen from Paper Mag felt that the poster hearkened back to Gaga's fashion choices during The Fame Monster (2009) era, suggesting the singer's return to avant-garde looks. He also found Las Vegas EDM and rave influences in the poster, likening it to an Electric Daisy Carnival. On December 4, 2018, Gaga shared a video from the rehearsal on her Instagram account showing her in a bodysuit with dots on it, utilizing motion capture while the song "Aura" played in the background. 

Coinciding with the residency, in May 2019, an exhibition called Haus of Gaga: Las Vegas also opened in Park MGM. It includes forty pieces of clothing and accessories from Gaga's personal archive, including her bodysuit from the 2009 MTV Video Music Awards, custom Alexander McQueen lace gown worn in the "Alejandro" music video, and her meat dress.

Production

Conception and stage

The Enigma show involves a loose storyline about "healing and finding yourself", with a setting aiming to emulate a post-apocalyptic punk environment. A script was written by Gaga, with photographer Eli Russel largely contributing to the creative part of the show, as well. Billboard Andreas Hale found the narrative "part Wizard of Oz and part Ghost in the Shell." Gaga wanted to integrate all her past hits into the show, while also giving it "a new feel for her interpretation of a Vegas show." The gig involves a character named Enigma, brought to life through motion capture by Gaga. Enigma was based on a character that was used during Gaga’s promotional rollout for her 2013 album, Artpop, called Petga. In a video posted on her social media by before the residency kicked off, Gaga referred to Enigma as her alter ego. Production designer LeRoy Bennett described the show as "a journey about Gaga and her Enigma character finding themselves within each other", therefore taking place "in various settings as she's going into her virtual world and her past. But it’s also the present and future, so it has to take on multiple personalities." Floating above the stage was a large light pod, which he called the "main lighting instrument" that could be interpreted as a spaceship or a cloud, or "energy beaming down on the stage to heal" Gaga. 

Gaga's aim for the Jazz & Piano part of her residency was "glamour and elegance". It features a 30-piece band in old-school booths, a stage illiuminated by neon colors, a curtain, and backdrop consisting of dangling crystals. LeRoy Bennett called it an extension of Gaga's joint concert series with Tony Bennett, the Cheek to Cheek Tour (2014–2015), adding that the "simple, but beatiful" concept transformed the venue into a jazz lounge.

Costume design 

Gaga worked with Nicola Formichetti on selecting the various outfits for the residency. For the Enigma show, the main inspiration was sci-fi, and the list of designers included Tom Ford, Asher Levine, and Vex Latex. Gaga's first look is a bejeweled, silver catsuit with built-in heeled boots, along with a black headpiece. The outfit was covered in tiny mirrors, with Out magazine's Glenn Garner noting that "given her nightlife roots, it’s fitting that she’s channeling a disco ball at the beginning of her show". Gaga then changed into a BDSM-inspired leather corset with neon green details. It was completed with a black PVC jacket with her initials written on the back side of it, featuring feathers in the same fluorescent green. A later look was an armor-inspired suit with light-up panels, which received comparison to a Patricia Field costume "for a movie about a late '80s heavy metal singer". Gaga also appeared in a transparent purple dress, with a metallic purple cut-out bodysuit underneath. For the finale, she was wearing a champagne-hued gold latex bodysuit with a collar which created the illusion of wings. Out Garner compared it to outfits from The Fifth Element and ones worn by David Bowie. Removing the outfit revealed a second-skin like, nude-colored unitard.

Designers who outfitted the Jazz & Piano shows include Ralph Lauren, Schiaparelli, Adrian Manceras, Armani Privé, and Gaga's sister, Natali Germanotta. According to Germanotta, during their creative process they used "elements from the Jazz Age, mixed with cabaret and vintage Vegas." Gaga's first ensemble for the show was a black sequin dress with a deep V neck, slit, crystal appliqués and crystal fringes. The look was completed with a Rinaldy Yunardi headpiece featuring jet-black spikes sprouting from it. For Vogue Alice Newbold, the headdress resembled the one worn by Cher for the 58th Academy Awards. Gaga changed into a champagne-colored, long-sleeved gown with more than 53,000 Swarovski micro-crytals and 250 rock crystals, along with a white feather cape. Later, a strapless black velvet gown was completed with a hot pink silk floor-length cape, which invoked the "Gentlemen Prefer Blondes-era" for Michael Love Michael of Paper Mag. For the finale, Gaga put on a black lamé tuxedo jumpsuit, with a detachable tiered skirt, embellished with Swarovski crystals, along with white tuxedo shirt, bow, and a top hat. Throughout the gig, Gaga was wearing various Jimmy Choo shoes. Later shows were updated with various new outfits. This includes a dusty rose-hued, feathery dress with an allover ostrich-feather coat; a black velvet bodice with a pink skirt, along with a cape coat with matching pink color; a long shimmering rhinestone gown; and a sparkling tassel dress reminiscent of a 1920s flapper, with matching head gear. In the visuals during Gaga's costume-changes, she is seen in a velvet and lace corset and velvet skirt gown with silver crystal leafs by Turkish designer Nedret Taciroğlu.

Concert synopsis

Enigma 

The Enigma show is approximately two hours long. It starts with an introduction where Enigma, a motion captured character who is Gaga's alter ego, welcomes the crowd. Shortly after, the singer appears in a sequined jumpsuit, suspended to the ceiling of the theater and performs "Just Dance" as she plays the keytar. After joining the stage, Gaga and her dancers perform "Poker Face" and "LoveGame". Then, she meets Enigma, who explains her who she is and that she's going to show Gaga the future through a simulation. 

After an interlude, the singer returns on stage wearing a fluorescent suit and a manga inspired wig, and performs "Dance in the Dark" and "Beautiful, Dirty, Rich". Gaga takes her jacket off and plays a custom-made instrument which includes a keyboard and guitar strings, while singing "The Fame". After performing "Telephone" and "Applause", Gaga realizes that in the simulation, paparazzi are dangerous and want to capture her. She performs "Paparazzi" up in the air in an orb-like cage, but quickly after, the paparazzi catch her and she performs "Aura" while they torture her. The third act opens with Gaga riding a giant mechanical robot, wearing a light-up futuristic catsuit, while singing "Scheiße". Pyrotechnic effects accompany the performance. The song transitions to "Judas", in which Gaga performs a long electric guitar solo. Later she performs "Government Hooker" with changed lyrics to address the Trump administration. After that, Gaga covers David Bowie's "I'm Afraid of Americans" while standing  in a circular keyboard console.

Following an interlude in which Enigma explains to Gaga that she must heal, "The Edge of Glory" and "Alejandro" are performed, with Gaga dressed in purple. Gaga sits down at piano at the end of the catwalk to sing "Million Reasons" and "You and I", where she is joined by her guitarists. The last act opens with "Bad Romance", performed in a cream latex suit on the catwalk while Gaga's dancers execute the choreography on the main stage. Enigma tells Gaga it is now time for her to leave, but Gaga insists to perform for her one last time. "Born This Way" follows, and after Gaga and her crew leave the stage, she comes back to sing "Shallow" on her piano as the encore.

Jazz & Piano 
The singer's Jazz & Piano engagement does not involve a comprehensive narrative as the Enigma show, but it is divided into four segments, each of them preceded by costume change and black-and-white interlude films. In the videos, Gaga talks about her love of Jazz and American classics, comparing singing jazz to "receiving a warm hug", and gives shout outs to performers who inspired her, including Billie Holiday, Etta James and Dinah Washington. The setlist involves 16 vintage covers, sprinkled with four of Gaga's own songs with new arrangements; this includes "Born This Way", which is performed in the style of a slow gospel number, and a "raging" performance of "Paparazzi", with "the full orchestra kicking in with some apropos suspense-movie chase music". In 2021, Gaga updated the setlist with new songs, including "Mambo Italiano", a choice she said was inspired by her movie, House of Gucci, and select songs from her second jazz album, Love for Sale, such as its title track, introduced as a song "every prostitute in Las Vegas sings". Inbetween songs, Gaga also shares personal stories serving as connecting tissues between the performed tracks.

Critical reception

Enigma 

Chris Willman from Variety called the Enigma show a "back-to-roots move for the superstar", as it focused on her "art and artifice of being spectacular", and complimented Gaga for singing live for its entirety. Mark Gray from People thought that the show was "highly energetic", which "lived up to the hype", and praised the theatricality of the show and the singer's connection with the audience. Andreas Hale from Billboard thought that the "set pieces were just as grandiose and over-the-top as the performances themselves" and the outfits were "outrageously unique". At the end of his review, he concluded that "it was obvious that Gaga was more than comfortable on the Vegas stage where many all-time greats cut their teeth. Simply put, she was born to do this." John Katsilometes, from the Las Vegas Review-Journal praised the singer's vocal and piano skills, saying that "she is dazzling dancing around the stage, a slim figure in a mirrored one-piece to open the night, but her heartfelt playing on the keyboards shows she can move a crowd subtly, too." Writing for Rolling Stone, Brittany Spanos highlighted the variety of the setlist and the use of props, while saying that "the best moments are the ones that feel improvised". She concluded her review by saying that Enigma "ended up becoming a show that confirms and begins her legacy". Paste Magazine Garrett Martin found Enigma "one of the most proudly over-the-top concert extravaganzas I’ve ever seen", while adding that the show "doesn’t just overpower you with lights, music and pyrotechnics, but with a sense of pride and inclusivity", complimenting Gaga's "touchingly earnest and heartfelt performance".

Entertainment Weekly journalist Marc Snetiker called the show "on the whole, rather nutty, (...) but Enigma the show is a damn good time, and it’s admirable in its attempts to elevate a greatest-hits gathering into something striving for more, something that perhaps even galvanized an artist in the peak of her career to take a Vegas residency in the first place." Randy Lewis from the Los Angeles Times thought that Gaga was "in full pop star mode", and while he appreciated the "gigantic" set pieces and the inclusion of the singer's biggest hits, he found the show "disjointed", with "little sense of narrative flow". He also added that the choreography "offers little in the way of physical expression or amplification of her songs’ lyrics or music", although he noted that it showcased "plenty of wild, kinetic energy". At Las Vegas Weekly, Leslie Ventura called Gaga "a perfectionist down to the smallest details, and her showmanship is unparalleled – her vocals, the costuming, the dancing, the hits." He however found the show "cheesy, weird and a little confusing at times", adding that "the Enigma concept grew a little tiresome after a while." Similarly, Miami New Times Celia Almedia, who reviewed the truncated version of Enigma in Miami, found the show's story line "hazy at best and sloppy at worst", and highlighted the piano performances as the gig’s "most successful" segment.

Jazz & Piano 

Variety magazine journalist Chris Willman thought that the Jazz & Piano arrangement was even better than the singer's other show, calling it "the best shot we're going to get at (...) time travel" as "this show recalls peak Vegas", and complimented the singer's "real emotion" showcased throughout this performance. Mikael Wood from the Los Angeles Times also compared it to Enigma, saying that "for all their differences in style and repertoire, both shows feel indelibly Gaga, linked by the unifying force of her wacky personality and her raw vocal talent." He further noticed, that "for her, the two Vegas performances aren’t opposed but complementary — part of the same determination to use artifice to say something real." Kevin Mazur of the Las Vegas Sun called Jazz & Piano "the quintessential Las Vegas show", thinking that "Gaga was mesmerizing all night, both behind the microphone and on the piano", while adding that the full orchestra and the Brian Newman Quintet "was spot-on too". 

John Katsilometes of the Las Vegas Review-Journal highlighted Gaga's vocal skills, saying she was "nailing several a cappella moments" during her jazz performances. Writing for Paper Mag, Michael Love Michael also complimented her voice, finding it "full of brightness, nuance, and emotion", while noting that Gaga's performance "brought up instant feelings of nostalgia that continued throughout the show". For Nick Remsen at Vogue, "Jazz & Piano is entertaining, engaging, educational (thanks in part to black and white filmic interludes...), and astutely conceived for power and provocation without being overbearing. Plus, it wholly demonstrates the extraordinary performing prowess and big heart [...] of its star."

Commercial performance 
Pre-sales for the show started on August 8, 2018, for Gaga's fan club members, followed by Citi bank credit card holders on the next day, getting an early chance at acquiring the tickets. There was also a pre-sale for MGM members as well as Live Nation and Ticketmaster customers which ran from August 11–12. The next day tickets for the show were available to the general public, including the general bookings and VIP packages for meet-and-greets. IQ magazine reported that the tickets were outselling nearest competitors, those of residencies by artists like Celine Dion and Britney Spears. The sales are also affected by the higher price range of the tickets in the secondary markets.

In February 2019, the first set of boxscores were reported by Billboard. Gaga earned $16 million from the 11 reported sold out dates, which when divided monthwise, resulted in grosses of $4.3 million in December 2018, $8.7 million in January 2019 and $2.9 million in February. Individual show grosses ranged from $1.41–$1.48 million, with the total audience rounding out at 59,162 tickets. According to the magazine's Eric Frankenberg, the total gross was "an electrifying opening pace for Gaga's Vegas residency", since the singer "outperformed" the opening grosses of all previous residencies by other artists—including Christina Aguilera, Britney Spears, Jennifer Lopez, the Backstreet Boys, Shania Twain and Gwen Stefani. With the gross, Gaga also became the fifth woman to pass the half-billion career total as per Billboard Boxscore. In 2019, the residency grossed $53,868,719 million for an average of $1,584,374 per concert, and  sold 185,019 tickets for an average of 5,442 per concert. The average ticket price was $291.15.

Set lists

This set list is from the December 28, 2018, concert. It is not intended to represent every show.

"Just Dance"
"Poker Face"
"LoveGame"
"Dance in the Dark"
"Beautiful, Dirty, Rich"
"The Fame"
"Telephone"
"Applause"
"Paparazzi"
"Aura"
"Scheiße"
"Judas"
"Government Hooker" 
"I'm Afraid of Americans" 
"The Edge of Glory"
"Alejandro"
"Million Reasons"
"You and I"
"Bad Romance"
"Born This Way"
Encore
"Shallow"

This set list is from the January 20, 2019, concert. It is not intended to represent every show.

"Luck Be a Lady"
"Anything Goes"
"Call Me Irresponsible"
"Orange Colored Sky"
"Poker Face"
"The Lady Is a Tramp"
"Cheek to Cheek" 
"I Can't Give You Anything but Love, Baby"
"Someone to Watch Over Me"
"Born This Way"
"Bang Bang (My Baby Shot Me Down)"
"Coquette"
"What a Diff'rence a Day Made"
"Paparazzi"
"La Vie en rose"
"Just a Gigolo" 
"Lush Life"
"Bad Romance"
"Fly Me to the Moon"
Encore
"New York, New York"

This set list is from the October 17, 2021, concert. It is not intended to represent every show.

 "Luck Be a Lady"
 "Orange Colored Sky"
 "Love for Sale"
 "Call Me Irresponsible"
 "Poker Face"
 "Bang Bang (My Baby Shot Me Down)"
 "I Can't Give You Anything but Love, Baby"
 "Let's Do It"
 "Do I Love You"
 "Born This Way"
 "Rags to Riches"
 "Mambo Italiano"
 "Coquette"
 "What a Diff'rence a Day Made"
 "Paparazzi"
 "La Vie en rose"
 "You're the Top"
 "Bad Romance"
 "Fly Me to the Moon"

Encore
"New York, New York"

On December 30, 2018, Gaga dedicated "You and I" to Celine Dion, who was attending the concert that night.
On January 20, 2019, Gaga performed "Cheek to Cheek" and "The Lady Is a Tramp" with Tony Bennett. 
On January 26, 2019, Bradley Cooper, who was in attendance that night, performed "Shallow" with Gaga.

Shows

Cancelled  dates

Notes

References

External links

2018 concert residencies
2019 concert residencies
2020 concert residencies
2021 concert residencies
2022 concert residencies
Concert residencies in the Las Vegas Valley
Lady Gaga
Music events cancelled due to the COVID-19 pandemic
Park MGM